is a Shinto shrine in Shimonoseki, Yamaguchi Prefecture, Japan. It is dedicated to Antoku, a Japanese emperor who died as a child in the Battle of Dan-no-ura (aka Dannoura), which occurred nearby in 1185. This battle was important in the history of Japan because it brought an end to Genpei War in which the Minamoto clan defeated the rival Taira clan, and ended the Taira bid for control of Japan.

The shrine is situated on the waterfront of the Kanmon Strait, between the centre of Shimonoseki and the tourist restaurants of Karato, Kanmon Wharf. The bright red main gate makes it a very visible sight.

Description
The colours and style of the gate are inspired by Ryūgū-jō, according to the Shimonoseki Tourist Guidebook published by the Shimonoseki City Tourism Department. This source states that Antoku's grandmother, Nii-no-Ama, who drowned with Antoku, wished for their palace to be created underwater as she jumped into the sea. Ryūgū-jō is a mythical underwater palace, belonging to the dragon god of the sea. In the Tale of Heike, Nii-no-Ama told Antoku, before jumping, that they would go to an underwater palace, without referring to Ryūgū-jō. Then, Antoku's mother (Kenreimon-In, aka Taira no Tokuko) had a dream, in which they were living in Ryūgū-jō.

Inside, in the Hoichi Hall, is a statue of Hoichi the Earless, one of the characters in a traditional ghost story which was made known in the west by Lafcadio Hearn.

The grounds also contain the Nanamori-zuka (seven mounds), which represent the Heike warriors also lost in the Battle of Dan-no-Ura.

Kanpei-sha
In 1871, the  identified the hierarchy of government-supported shrines most closely associated with the Imperial family. The kampeisha were shrines venerated by the imperial family. This category encompasses those sanctuaries enshrining emperors, imperial family members, or meritorious retainers of the Imperial family. Up through 1940, the mid-range of ranked Imperial shrines or  included the shrine; and it was then known as Akama-gū In 1940, Akama's status was changed , which is the highest rank; and since then, it has been known as Akama jingū.

See also
 List of Jingū
 Modern system of ranked Shinto Shrines

Notes

References
 Japan National Tourist Organisation (note that the information that Emperor Antoku was three years old when he died is contradicted by other sources, which say that although he was a young child, he was a few years older than that. See the Wikipedia page for Antoku)
 Ponsonby-Fane, Richard Arthur Brabazon. (1959). The Imperial House of Japan. Kyoto: Ponsonby Memorial Society. OCLC 194887
 ___. (1962). Studies in Shinto and Shrines. Kyoto: Ponsonby Memorial Society. OCLC 399449
 ___. (1963). The Viciissitudes of Shinto. Kyoto: Ponsonby Memorial Society. 

Kanpei-taisha
Jingū
Shinto shrines in Yamaguchi Prefecture
Beppyo shrines